Johny Mera Naam Preethi Mera Kaam is a 2011 Indian Kannada-language romance film starring Duniya Vijay and Ramya. The film is directed by Preetam Gubbi of Mungaru Male fame. Jayanna and Bhogendra have jointly produced this venture under Jayanna combines banner. V. Harikrishna has composed the music and a long associate, S.Krishna works as the cameraman. The sequel to the film Johnny Johnny Yes Papa was released in 2018.

Plot

Cast
 Duniya Vijay as Johnny
 Ramya as Priya
 Rangayana Raghu as Maamu
 Sadhu Kokila as Dr. Halappa
 Dattanna as Taata
 Achyuth Kumar Priya's father 
 Karthik Jayaram
 Sharan
Dharma as Yacoob bhai 
Raghava Uday 
K. D. Venkatesh 
Mallesh Gowda 
 Ramesh Bhat
Bulli Rakesh 
Arasu Maharaj 
Venki Ram 
Madhu Hegde 
Shankar Bhat

Music

Reception 
Shruti Indira Lakshminarayana from Rediff.com scored the film at 2.5 out of 5 stars and says "With each film, he seems to be becoming as better dancer as well. There is spunk to his character and look. The chalk and cheese pairing of Vijay and Ramya also works. Ramya does a neat job and looks glamorous. Songs are the other highpoint of the film. They haunt you even after you've left the theatres. The film could have packed much more energy and fun given the director and his capable cast". A critic from The Times of India scored the film at 4 out of 5 stars and wrote "'Pakkadmane
Hudugi' (neighbourhood girl). Rangayana Raghu is marvellous as an ‘aunt’. Sharan, Dattanna and Achyuth Kumar have done justice to their roles. Camera work by Krishna and music by V Harikrishna have boosted the screenplay". A critic from The New Indian Express wrote "Harikrishna has provided lilting music. Songs are full of rhythm. Cinematographer Krishna has done a neat job behind the camera. The movie is worth watching if you are interested in entertainment".

References

2011 films
2010s Kannada-language films
Films scored by V. Harikrishna
Films directed by Preetham Gubbi